In traditionalist philosophy, desacralization of knowledge or secularization of knowledge is the process of separation of knowledge from its supposed divine source—God or the Ultimate Reality. The process reflects a paradigm shift in modern conception of knowledge in that it has rejected divine revelations as well as the idea of spiritual and metaphysical foundations of knowledge, confining knowledge to empirical domain and reason alone. Although it is a recurrent theme among the writers of the Traditionalist school that began with René Guénon, a French mystic and intellectual who earlier spoke of "the limitation of knowledge to its lowest order", the process of desacralization of knowledge was most notably surveyed, chronicled and conceptualized by the Iranian philosopher Seyyed Hossein Nasr in his 1981 Gifford Lectures that were later published as Knowledge and the Sacred.

Origin of the concept
The theme of desacralization of knowledge has occupied a prominent place among writers of the traditionalist school, going back to the French mystic and intellectual René Guénon, who previously spoke of "the limitation of knowledge to its lowest order", that is, the reduction of knowledge to “the empirical and analytic study”. The process of desacralization of knowledge was, however, systematically conceptualized by Seyyed Hossein Nasr in his 1981 Gifford Lectures, which were eventually published as Knowledge and the Sacred.

Themes
According to Nasr, desacralization of knowledge is one of the most significant aspects of secularism, which he defines as "everything whose origin is merely human and therefore non-divine and whose metaphysical basis lies in [its] ontological hiatus between man and God". The core idea of desacralization of knowledge is that modern civilization has lost the transcendent dimensions of knowledge, which are based on revelation and intellection, by confining knowledge solely to rational and empirical domains.

In Nasr's exposition, the words "to know" and "knowledge" forfeit their unidimensional character. In his view, knowledge proceeds in a hierarchical order from empirical and rational modes of knowing to the supreme form of knowledge which he calls the "unitive knowledge" or "al-ma’rifah". Similarly, "to know" begins with ratiocination and progresses to intellection, a process that entails the attainment of spiritual knowledge through the human intellect—the perceived "universal faculty which is within the individual yet transcends his individuality".  Nasr contends that as knowledge is inseparable from being, it is inherently connected to the sacred, which is synonymous with the Ultimate Reality. To be human is to know, which ultimately means knowing the Supreme Self—God—who is the source of all knowledge and consciousness. According to Nasr, it is the post-medieval process of secularization and a humanism that have eventually forced the separation of knowledge from being and intelligence from the Sacred, which "is both the Knower and the Known, inner consciousness and outer reality".

In Nasr's view, modern science has reduced multiple domains of reality to a psycho-physical one. In the absence of a spiritual vision, science is said to become concerned with changes in the material world alone. According to this viewpoint, since modern science has rejected the notion of a hierarchy of being, scientific theories and discoveries are no longer capable of appreciating the truths that belong to a higher order of reality. Nasr thus views modern science as an "incomplete" or a "superficial science" that is only concerned with certain parts of reality while invalidating others. It is believed to be founded on the distinction between the knowing subject and the known object. This perspective maintains that modern science has lost its symbolic spirit and the transcendental dimension because it has repudiated the role of intellect in pursuing knowledge and truth by adopting a purely quantitative method. Nasr blames secularism for the desacralization of science and knowledge. In this process, science and knowledge is said to become separated, losing the uniformity that they had in the form of traditional sacred knowledge. According to Nasr, the structure of reality remains constant, but human perception and vision of that reality change. Modern Western philosophy, with no perceived sense of permanence, has reduced reality to a temporal process. According to Jane I. Smith, this reductionism is what Nasr identifies as the desacralization of knowledge and the loss of the sense of the sacred, necessitating a choice between a form of knowledge that tends to focus on change, multiplicity, and outwardness, and “one that integrates change within the eternal, multiplicity within unity, and outward facts within inward principles.”

Historical development

The process of desacralization of knowledge began with the ancient Greeks. According to Nasr, the rationalists and skeptics of ancient Greek philosophical traditions played a major role in the process of desacralization by reducing knowledge either to ratiocination or to cognitive exercise. In substituting reason for intellect and sensuous knowledge for inner illumination, the Greeks pioneered the process of desacralization of knowledge. Other major stages in the process of desacralization include the formation of Renaissance philosophical systems that had developed a concept of nature, which is independent and self-creative. The process, however, reached its climax in the thought of René Descartes, "the father of modern Western philosophy,"  who "made thinking of the individual ego the center of reality and criterion of all knowledge". Thereafter, knowledge eventually became rooted in the cogito. 
According to the Dictionary of Literary Biography:

In his contribution to the volume of the Library of Living Philosophers, which was devoted to Nasr's life and thought, Liu Shu-hsien, a Neo-Confucian philosopher, writes:

One "powerful instrument" of desacralization in history includes the theory of evolution, which according to Nasr "is a desperate attempt to substitute a set of horizontal, material causes in a unidimensional world to explain effects whose causes belong to other levels of reality, to the vertical dimensions of existence". He says the theory of evolution, and its use by modernists and liberal theologians including Aurobindo Ghose and Pierre Teilhard de Chardin has been a "major force" in the process of desacralization of knowledge. According to David Burrell, the "roots of the betrayal" may be found "on the other side of Descartes", in the high scholasticism that includes the thought of Thomas Aquinas, Bonaventure and Duns Scotus. According to Nasr, their syntheses "tended to become over-rationalistic in imprisoning intuitions of a metaphysical order in syllogistic categories which were to hide, rather than reveal, their properly speaking intellectual rather than purely rational character".

Effects

According to the traditional perspective, externalization and desacralization of knowledge has led to the belief all that can be understood is science in terms of information, quantification, analysis and their subsequent technological implications. The questions of religion, God, eternal life and the nature of the soul are all outside the realm of scientific knowledge and thus are only matters of faith. The desacralized knowledge is said to have affected all areas of culture, including art, science and religion, and has also had an impact on human nature. This account maintains that the effect of desacralized, profane knowledge is felt within the value system, thought processes and structure of feelings. Nasr says the desacralized knowledge and science affects the use of technology and has resulted in ecological catastrophes. It results in highly compartmentalized science whose ignorance of the divine destroys the outward and inward spiritual ambience of humans.

Reception
According to Liu Shu-hsien, the process of desacralization of knowledge is not as bad as Nasr has anticipated. Shu-hsien says there is an overwhelming necessity for desacralization of knowledge within the domain of empirical science because the quest of certainty is no longer a viable objective. According to David Harvey, the Enlightenment thought sought demystification and desacralization of knowledge, and social organization to free humans from their bonds. Svend Brinkmann says of the need for desacralization of knowledge; "if knowing is a human activity, it is always already situated somewhere – in some cultural, historical and social situation". For David Burrell, scholars are more at ease with Nasr's criticism of "enlightenment philosophical paradigm" in an explicitly postmodern world. Those who would argue "if knowledge cannot be secured in Descartes’s fashion, it cannot be secured at all" might have modern presumptions.

Other scholarly trends

Maslow’s desacralization
The American psychologist Abraham Maslow's (1966) concept of desacralization is based on "the type of science that lacks emotion, joy, wonder, awe, and rapture". He urged scientists to reintroduce values, creativity, emotion, and ritual to their work. For this, science must be resacralized, which means it needs to be imbued with ritual, passion, and human values. Astronomers, for instance, need to be astounded by the stars as much as study them. Psychologists must appreciate, be excited about, be in awe of, and have affection for the people they examine.

Other accounts
Several other academics have discussed the theme of secularization of knowledge in a number of other contexts. In a 1989 paper, British historian of science John Hedley Brooke, for instance, described the secularization of knowledge in the context of the eighteenth century scientific developments, contending that the process of secularization of science is evident in the changes of the theories of matter, celestial mechanics, the earth sciences, and the life sciences. Brad S. Gregory, a history professor at the University of Notre Dame, sought to examine the impact of the Reformation era on the field of knowledge in his 2019 article, in an effort to demonstrate how "religious disagreements" within the Christian tradition opened the way for the secularization of knowledge.

See also
 Disenchantment
 Secularization
 Scientia sacra

Notes

References

Sources

Further reading

External links
 Chapter One: Knowledge and Its Desacralization From Knowledge and the Sacred by Seyyed Hossein Nasr

Epistemology of religion
Philosophy of religion
Philosophy of science
Esotericism
Seyyed Hossein Nasr